Carlos Sanz is an American actor. He is best known for playing the main villain, Carlito, in the 2006 film Crank.

Early life
Sanz grew up in Chicago and has two brothers, Steve and the actor Horatio Sanz. He and his family grew up in the Humboldt Park neighborhood. He graduated the University of Illinois Chicago, where he studied mathematics and philosophy.

Career
Sanz has worked with such notable film directors as Ron Howard, Andrew Davis and Alan Rudolf. He played mob boss Manuel Garza in the comedy Beer for My Horses, starring Toby Keith, Rodney Carrington and Willie Nelson. He can be seen in the Lifetime movie Detention, starring alongside Penelope Ann Miller. Sanz played an LA detective in The Take along with John Leguizamo, Tyrese Gibson and Rosie Perez. In the 2006 hit Crank, starring Jason Statham, he played the lead character of Carlito, one of the main antagonists of the film. He can also be seen in the comedy Dishdogz, where he does an homage to Harold Ramis.

Sanz appeared in The Shield as Det. Carlos Zamora and NYPD Blue as Det. Ray Olivo. He also made appearances on episodes of Criminal Minds, 24, Close to Home, and Las Vegas. He played Dr. Victor Rodriguez for two seasons on the NBC daytime drama Another World.

Sanz has worked around the world including the Arena Stage, in a two-person play about Georgia O'Keeffe and her companion. He has also performed with Don Cheadle at the Goodman Theatre, South Coast Repertory, Royal Shakespeare Company, Thalia Theater, the San Diego Repertory Theatre, and others.

Filmography

Film

Television

External links

References 

Male actors from Chicago
Male actors from Santiago
American male comedians
American male film actors
American male television actors
Living people
Year of birth missing (living people)
Place of birth missing (living people)
Chilean emigrants to the United States
People from Santiago
Comedians from Illinois
University of Illinois Chicago alumni